A roller coaster, or rollercoaster, is a type of amusement ride that employs a form of elevated railroad track designed with tight turns, steep slopes, and sometimes inversions. Passengers ride along the track in open cars, and the rides are often found in amusement parks and theme parks around the world. LaMarcus Adna Thompson obtained one of the first known patents for a roller coaster design in 1885, related to the Switchback Railway that opened a year earlier at Coney Island. The track in a coaster design does not necessarily have to be a complete circuit, as shuttle roller coasters demonstrate. Most roller coasters have multiple cars in which passengers sit and are restrained. Two or more cars hooked together are called a train. Some roller coasters, notably Wild Mouse roller coasters, run with single cars.

History

The Russian mountain and the Aerial Promenades

The oldest roller coasters are believed to have originated from the so-called "Russian Mountains", specially constructed hills of ice located in the area that is now Saint Petersburg, Russia. Later, in 1784, Catherine the Great is said to have constructed a sledding hill in the gardens of her palace at Oranienbaum in St. Petersburg.

The first modern roller coaster, the Promenades Aériennes, opened in Parc Beaujon in Paris on July 8, 1817. It featured wheeled cars securely locked to the track, guide rails to keep them on course, and higher speeds. It spawned half a dozen imitators, but their popularity soon declined.

However, during the Belle Epoque they returned to fashion.

Scenic railways

In 1827, a mining company in Summit Hill, Pennsylvania constructed the Mauch Chunk Switchback Railway, a downhill gravity railroad used to deliver coal to Mauch Chunk, Pennsylvania – now known as Jim Thorpe. By the 1850s, the "Gravity Road" (as it became known) was selling rides to thrill seekers. Railway companies used similar tracks to provide amusement on days when ridership was low.

Using this idea as a basis, LaMarcus Adna Thompson began work on a gravity Switchback Railway that opened at Coney Island in Brooklyn, New York, in 1884. Passengers climbed to the top of a platform and rode a bench-like car down the  track up to the top of another tower where the vehicle was switched to a return track and the passengers took the return trip. This track design was soon replaced with an oval complete circuit. In 1885, Phillip Hinkle introduced the first full-circuit coaster with a lift hill, the Gravity Pleasure Road, which became the most popular attraction at Coney Island. Not to be outdone, in 1886 Thompson patented his design of roller coaster that included dark tunnels with painted scenery. "Scenic railways" were soon found in amusement parks across the county.

Popularity, decline, and revival
By 1919, the first underfriction roller coaster had been developed by John Miller. Over the next decade, roller coasters spread to amusement parks around the world and began an era in the industry often referred to as the "Golden Age". One of the most well-known from the period is the historical Cyclone that opened at Coney Island in 1927. The onset of the Great Depression in the 1930s, however, significantly impacted the amusement park industry and brought an end to the rapid growth experienced during the Golden Age. This aside, roller coasters were still built with varying success from location to location. In May 1932, the Scene Railway witnessed somewhat of a revival in the UK, including the opening of the roller coaster at Great Yarmouth. Today it is one of only two scenic railways still in operation in the UK.

In 1959, Disneyland introduced a design breakthrough with Matterhorn Bobsleds, the first permanent roller coaster to use a tubular steel track. Designed by Arrow Development, the tubular track was unlike standard rail design on wooden coasters, allowing the track to bend in sharper angles in any direction, leading to the incorporation of loops, corkscrews, and inversion elements into track layouts. A little more than a decade later, the immediate success of The Racer at Kings Island in 1972 sparked a new era of roller coaster enthusiasm, which led to a resurgence across the amusement park industry over the next several decades.

Etymology

There are several explanations for the name roller coaster. It is said to have originated from an early American design where slides or ramps were fitted with rollers over which a sled would coast. This design was abandoned in favor of fitting the wheels to the sled or other vehicles, but the name endured.

Another explanation is that the phrase originated from a ride located in a roller skating rink in Haverhill, Massachusetts in 1887. A toboggan-like sled was raised to the top of a track which consisted of hundreds of rollers. This Roller Toboggan then took off down gently rolling hills to the floor. The inventors of this ride, Stephen E. Jackman and Byron B. Floyd, claim that they were the first to use the term "roller coaster".

The term jet coaster is used for roller coasters in Japan, where such amusement park rides are very popular.

In many languages, the name refers to "Russian mountains". Contrastingly, in Russian, they are called "American mountains". In the Scandinavian languages, the roller coaster is referred as "mountain-and-valley railway". German knows the word "Achterbahn", stemming from "Figur-8-Bahn", like Dutch "Achtbaan", relating to the form of the number 8 ("acht" in German and also Dutch).

Mechanics

Roller coaster trains are not typically powered. Most are pulled up a lift hill by a chain or cable and released downhill. The potential energy accumulated by the rise in height is transferred to kinetic energy, which is then converted back into potential energy as the train rises up the next hill. Changes in elevation become smaller throughout the track's course, as some mechanical energy is lost to friction and air drag. A properly-designed, outdoor track will result in a train having enough kinetic energy to complete the entire course under a variety of stressful weather conditions.

Not all coasters feature a lift hill, however. A train may also be set into motion by a launch mechanism such as a flywheel, linear induction motor (LIM), linear synchronous motor (LSM), hydraulic launch, or drive tire. Some launched roller coasters are capable of reaching greater speeds using less track when compared to traditional coasters that rely on a conventional lift hill.

A brake run at the end of the circuit is the most common method of stopping a roller coaster train as it returns to the station. One notable exception is a powered roller coaster, which instead of relying on gravity uses one or more motors to propel the trains along the course.

In 2006, NASA announced that it would build a system using principles similar to those of a roller coaster to help astronauts escape the Ares I launch pad in an emergency, although this has since been scrapped along with the rest of the Ares program.

Safety

Safety mechanisms and technology 
A variety of safety mechanisms protect riders on roller coasters. One of these is the block system. Most large roller coasters have the ability to run two or more trains at once, and the block system prevents these trains from colliding. In this system, the track is divided into two or more sections known as blocks. Only one train is permitted in each block at any given time. There is a section of track at the end of each block where a train can be stopped if necessary, such as preventing dispatch from the station, stopping a lift, or simply applying brakes. Sensors detect when a train passes so that the system's computer is aware of which blocks are occupied. If a train attempts to enter an occupied block, the stopping mechanisms in all blocks are engaged.

Restraints are another critical aspect to roller coaster safety. Generally speaking, roller coasters usually have two different types: Over-the-shoulder-restraints and lap bar restraints. With both, hydraulic and mechanical  safety mechanisms are used within the restraints. Mechanical restraints use a system known as a ratchet and pawl. When riding a roller coaster with a ratchet and pawl system, the sound of clicks can be heard when pulling down the restraint. Hydraulic restraints use a piston and cylinder. Unlike mechanical restraints, there is no feeling of physical or sound of clicks from the restraint being locked in place. Most modern day roller coasters have sensors that are used to make sure each restraint is locked. If all the restraints are locked, it will send a signal to the ride computer letting it know that it is clear for dispatch. If all restraints are not locked, the train will not be able to move out of the station until each restraint is locked.

Braking systems such pivoting paws are used on the bottom of the train and on the inclined lift hill. While the cart goes up the lift hill, it is usually pulled by a chain. The pawl moves over bumps that are separated closely apart. In the event that the train ever becomes disconnected from the chain, the anti roll-back system will engage and it will fall back into the nearest downhill stop preventing the train from falling down the lift hill.

Another key to safety is the programmable logic controller (PLC), an essential component of a roller coaster's computer system. Multiple PLCs work together to detect faults associated with operation and automate decisions to engage various elements (e.g. lift, brakes, etc.). Periodic maintenance and visual inspection by ride engineers are also important to verify that structures and materials are within expected wear tolerances and functioning correctly. Effective operating procedures further enhance safety.

Roller coaster design & statistics 
Roller coaster design is another important aspect that requires a working knowledge of basic physics to enhance ride comfort and avoid harmful strain to the rider. Ride designers must carefully analyze the movement a ride subjects its riders to, ensuring it is within a reasonable tolerance. The human body needs sufficient time to react to sudden changes in force in order to control muscle tension and avoid harmful consequences such as whiplash. Designers typically try to stay in the range of 4–6Gs (40–60 m s−2) as a maximum for positive g-force acceleration, which increases the feeling of weight and pushes riders downward into their seat. For negative g-force, or the feeling of weightlessness, the target is 1.5–2Gs (15–20 m s−2) as a maximum.[ These fall into a range considered safe to a majority of the population. Lateral acceleration is also typically kept under 2Gs using various techniques including the banking of curves.

Wheels are a critical part in rollercoaster design. The purpose of wheels is to keep the train on the track and to prevent it from flying off. A majority of roller coaster wheels are made from polyurethane. There are 3 kinds of roller coaster wheels which include road wheels, side friction wheels, and up-stop wheels. Road wheels ride on top of the track. Side friction wheels ride on the side of the track so that the train can move through turns without flying off the side of the track. Up-stop wheels are the wheels that ride below the track and prevent it from lifting off the track.

Roller coasters are statistically very safe when compared to other activities, but despite all the safety measures in place, accidents still occur. The International Association of Amusement Parks and Attractions (IAPPA) reports that a rider has one chance in 15.5 million of being injured on a ride. Also, "In a typical year, more than 385 million guests enjoyed in excess of 1.7 billion rides at approximately 400 North American fixed-site facilities". IAPPA is required to report annual ride incidents to the National Safety Council.

Types

Roller coasters are divided into two main categories: steel roller coasters and wooden roller coasters. Steel coasters have tubular steel tracks, and compared to wooden coasters, they are typically known for offering a smoother ride and their ability to turn riders upside-down. Wooden coasters have flat steel tracks, and are typically renowned for producing "air time" through the use of negative G-forces when reaching the crest of some hill elements. Newer types of track, such as I-Box and Topper introduced by Rocky Mountain Construction (RMC), improve the ride experience on wooden coasters, lower maintenance costs, and add the ability to invert riders.

A third classification type is often referred to as a hybrid roller coaster, which utilize a mixture of wood and steel elements for the track and structure. Many, for example, have a track made out of steel and a support structure made from wood. RMC has notably redesigned wood coasters that have either deteriorated from age or been deemed by parks as too costly to maintain. RMC often replaces the wood track with their patented steel I-Box track design, while reusing much of the ride's wooden structure, resulting in a smoother ride with the incorporation of new design elements, such as inversions, sharper turns, and steeper drops.

Although the term wasn't widely used or accepted until the 21st century, one of the oldest examples is Cyclone at Luna Park, which opened in 1927. It features a wood track and steel structure. Other older examples include mine train roller coasters, many of which were built by Arrow Dynamics. The term hybrid became more prominent after the introduction of New Texas Giant at Six Flags Over Texas opened in 2011. Many in the industry, however, continue to classify coasters strictly by their track type only, labeling them either steel or wood.

Modern roller coasters are constantly evolving to provide a variety of different experiences. More focus is being placed on the position of riders in relation to the overall experience. Traditionally, riders sit facing forward, but newer variations such as stand-up and flying models position the rider in different ways to change the experiences. A flying model, for example, is a suspended roller coaster where the riders lie facing forward and down with their chests and feet strapped in. Other ways of enhancing the experience involve removing the floor beneath passengers riding above the track, as featured in floorless roller coasters. Also new track elements – usually types of inversions – are often introduced to provide entirely new experiences.

By train type
 Bobsled roller coaster
 Dive roller coaster
 Floorless roller coaster
 Flying roller coaster
 Fourth-dimension roller coaster
 Inverted roller coaster
 Mine train roller coaster
 Swinging mine train roller coaster
 Motorbike roller coaster
 Mountain/Alpine roller coaster
 Pipeline roller coaster
 Side friction roller coaster
 Spinning roller coaster
 Stand-up roller coaster
 Steeplechase roller coaster
 Suspended roller coaster
 Virginia Reel roller coaster
 Water coaster 
 Wing roller coaster
 Zipline roller coaster

By track layout
 Boomerang roller coaster
 Corkscrew roller coaster
 Dual-tracked roller coaster
 Figure 8 roller coaster
 Out and back roller coaster
 Shuttle roller coaster
 Terrain roller coaster
 Twister roller coaster
 Wild Mouse roller coaster

By mechanics
 Chain-lift/cable lift/Elevator lift/Ferris Wheel lift roller coaster
 Launched roller coaster
 Powered roller coaster

By height

Several height classifications have been used by parks and manufacturers in marketing their roller coasters, as well as enthusiasts within the industry. One classification, the kiddie coaster, is a roller coaster specifically designed for younger riders. Following World War II, parks began pushing for more of them to be built in contrast to the height and age restrictions of standard designs at the time. Companies like Philadelphia Toboggan Company (PTC) developed scaled-down versions of their larger models to accommodate the demand. A notable example of a junior coaster is the Sea Dragon – the oldest operating roller coaster from PTC's legendary designer John Allen – which opened at Wyandot Lake in 1956 near Powell, Ohio.

Hypercoaster

A hypercoaster, occasionally stylized as hyper coaster, is a type of roller coaster with a height or drop of at least . Moonsault Scramble, which debuted at Fuji-Q Highland in 1984, was the first to break this barrier, though the term hypercoaster was first coined by Cedar Point and Arrow Dynamics with the opening of Magnum XL-200 in 1989. Hypercoasters have become one of the most predominant types of roller coasters in the world, now led by manufacturers Bolliger & Mabillard and Intamin.

Giga coaster
A giga coaster is a type of roller coaster with a height or drop of at least . The term was coined during a partnership between Cedar Point and Intamin on the construction of Millennium Force. Although Morgan and Bolliger & Mabillard have not used the term giga, both have also produced roller coasters in this class.

Strata coaster
A strata coaster is a type of roller coaster with a height or drop of at least . As with the other two height classifications, the term strata was first introduced by Cedar Point with the release of Top Thrill Dragster, a  roller coaster that opened in 2003. Superman: Escape From Krypton exceeded  back when it opened in 1997, but its shuttle coaster design where the trains don't travel a complete circuit usually prevents the roller coaster from being classified in the same category.

Major roller coaster manufacturers

 Allan Herschell Company (defunct, merged with Chance Rides)
 Arrow Development (acquired by Huss Trading Corporation, formed into Arrow-Huss)
 Arrow Dynamics (defunct, assets bought by S&S Arrow)
 ART Engineering
 Arrow-Huss (defunct, reformed as Arrow Dynamics)
 B.A. Schiff & Associates
 Bolliger & Mabillard
 Bradley and Kaye (defunct)
 Chance Morgan
 Chance Rides
 Custom Coasters International (defunct)
 D. H. Morgan Manufacturing (acquired by Michael Chance, formed into Chance Morgan)
 Dinn Corporation (defunct)
 Dynamic Structures
 E&F Miler Industries
 Fabbri Group
 Gerstlauer
 Giovanola (defunct)
 The Gravity Group
 Great Coasters International
 Hopkins Rides
 Intamin
 Mack Rides
 Maurer AG
 Martin & Vleminckx
 Philadelphia Toboggan Coasters
 Pinfari (defunct)
 Premier Rides
 Preston & Barbieri
 Reverchon Industries (defunct)
 Ride Engineers Switzerland
 Rocky Mountain Construction
 Roller Coaster Corporation of America (defunct)
 Sansei Technologies
 S&S - Sansei Technologies (formerly known as S&S Worldwide)
 SBF Visa Group
 Schwarzkopf (defunct)
 TOGO (defunct)
 Vekoma
 Zamperla
 Zierer

Gallery

See also

 Amusement park (List of amusement parks)
 RollerCoaster Tycoon 
 Thrillville: Off the Rails – video game with roller coaster design simulator
 List of roller coaster rankings
 Train (roller coaster)

References

Further reading
Bennett, David (1998). Roller Coaster: Wooden and Steel Coasters, Twisters and Corkscrews.  Edison, New Jersey: Chartwell Books. 9. .

Coker, Robert (2002). Roller Coasters: A Thrill Seeker's Guide to the Ultimate Scream Machines.  New York: Metrobooks.  14.  .

External links

 Roller Coaster Glossary
 Roller Coaster History – History of the roller coaster
 Roller Coaster Database – Information, statistics and photos for over 3700 roller coasters throughout the world
 Roller Coaster Patents – With links to the U.S. Patent office
 Roller Coaster Physics  – Classic physics explained in terms of roller coasters
 How Roller Coasters Work
 3D Animated Roller Coaster in MS Excel
 Magic Mountain Announces ‘Twisted’ Plans for Iconic Colossus Roller Coaster

 
Articles containing video clips

Russian inventions
French inventions